Koszorów  is a small village in the administrative district of Gmina Chlewiska, within Szydłowiec County, Masovian Voivodeship, in east-central Poland.

The village has a population of 142.

References

Villages in Szydłowiec County